Maurice Cole (1902 – 1990), was an English pianist, teacher and adjudicator. He was born in London and studied at the Guildhall School of Music and privately with Arthur De Greef in London and Brussels.

Cole was the first pianist to broadcast a recital on the BBC and went on to perform, amongst many other compositions, both books of Bach's Well-Tempered Clavier on the BBC Third Programme. He was professor at the Guildhall School of Music from 1953, was appointed Professor of Pianoforte at the School on two occasions and was a member of the Incorporated Society of Musicians. He was married with Doris Allen.

During the Second World War, he was a member of ENSA and entertained the forces, both in London and abroad. He partnered with the pianist composer Helen Pyke for piano duets before her death in 1954. In 1958, he went on an extensive performance tour to Australia, New Zealand, Fiji and other countries.

Cole recorded extensively in the 1920s and 1930s for release on 78 rpm for Vocalion, for Hyperion during the late 1940s, and for Classics Club Records during the late 1950s (later reissued by Saga Records). He was also one of the first pianists to broadcast from the Marconi House Studio in 1922 and also broadcast from Savoy Hill.

Known recordings

78 rpm
Edvard Grieg, Papillons, Franz Schubert, Moment Musical, Felix Mendelssohn, Bees Wedding, Frédéric Chopin, Prelude, ACO G 15387 (acoustic recording)
Balfour Gardiner, Humoreske, Cyril Scott, Danse Negre, ACO G 15351 (acoustic recording)
Sergei Rachmaninoff, Polichinelle, Moritz Moszkowski, En Automne, ACO G 15087 (acoustic recording, Recorded: c. 1924)
Cécile Chaminade, Danse Creole/Pierrette, ACO, G15331
Leo Delibes (arr. Dohnanyi), Naila Waltz, ACO G 16111
Frédéric Chopin, Ballade No. 1, Broadcast Twelve 5076, Recorded: c. 1929
Frédéric Chopin, Ballade in A-flat, Broadcast Twelve 5034
John Ireland, The Island Spell/Rachmaninoff, Prelude in C-sharp minor, ACO G15523
Sergei Rachmaninoff, Prelude in C-sharp minor/Franz Liszt, Liebesträume, Broadcast Twelve 5008
Cécile Chaminade, Automne, Edvard Grieg, Little bird, Christian Sinding, Rustle of spring, Broadcast Twelve 5009
Edvard Grieg, Concerto in A minor, Broadcast F 4011, F 4012, F 4013 (electrical recording)
Franz Liszt, Hungarian Fantasia, Broadcast Twelve 5087, 5088
Pyotr Ilyich Tchaikovsky, Concerto No.1 in B-flat minor, Broadcast Twelve 5118, 5119, 5120, 5121
Gabriel Fauré, Impromptu, Acetate disc recording (located Sakuraphon)

33 rpm
J. S. Bach "Concerto in the Italian Style / Overture in the French Manner", Saga Records
J.S. Bach – Das Wohltemperirte Klavier, Book I and II (The Well-Tempered Clavier) Saga Records
Beethoven Variations Opp. 34 & 35, Rondo in G Op. 51/2, Saga Records
Brahms selected piano pieces, Classics Club
Franck Prélude, Choral et Fugue, Classics Club

Known performances

Christchurch Town Hall
6 January 1941

St. Peter's Hall
28 November 1942, Recital by Maurice Cole (piano), Harold Fairhurst (violin) and Margaret Bissett (alto), in aid of the Linen Guild of the Royal Victoria and West Hants Hospital

Bournemouth Chamber Music Society
4 February 1950, Frederick Fuller (baritone), Maurice Cole (piano)
Paganini-Liszt, Study no. 2 in E-flat
Stanford, An Irish Idyll (six miniatures)
Schubert, "Der Musensohn" (The Son of the Muses)
Bax, Hill Tune
Khatchaturian, Toccata
Beethoven, Sonata in A-flat major, Op. 110
Schubert, "Heidenröslein" (Wild Rose)	
Schubert, "Am Meer" (By the Sea)
Schubert, "Fischerweise" (Fisherman's Song)
Schubert, "Nachtstück" (Night Piece)
Scarlatti, Sonata in A major
Scarlatti, Sonata in B minor
Bach, Prelude and Fugue in D major

BBC Henry Wood Promenade
Monday 7 September 1959, Basil Cameron, John Hollingsworth, Constance Shacklock (contralto), Nicanor Zabaleta (harp), Maurice Cole (piano)
Bach, Brandenburg Concerto No. 3
Handel, "Ombra mai fu", recitative and aria from Xerxes
Bach, Piano Concerto No. 1 in D minor
Handel, Concerto in B-flat for Harp and Small Orchestra
Handel, Suite from The Water Music (arr. Harty)
Rodrigo, Concierto serenata for harp and orchestra
Bax, Tintagel

Published works
Violin concerto / Alberto Ginastera ; reduction for violin and piano by Maurice Cole. Boosey & Hawkes, 1967. 1 score + 1 part.

Criticism

Tchaikovsky: Piano Concerto No. 1
"One can perhaps scarcely expect subtlety for eight shillings. What we get is sensible work and passable orchestral tone, with the pianoforte’s part a good way the best of the bargain. Would it be better worth while to improve the orchestral tone, and charge a little more for the records – if that could be arranged?".

Grieg piano concerto
"I have never regarded Mr. Cole as an extremely fine interpreter—more as a sound general utility man. Still, the records are well worth trying by those who like hefty playing... ...In the slow movement (of the Greig piano concerto) the opening orchestral section is omitted and the movement is taken a little faster than the marked speed. The pianist is too urgent in this. It needs stroking. Some of his notes clang a trifle more than I like."

Chopin, Rachmaninov, Grieg
"Reginald Paul's British contemporary Maurice Cole made a number of highly impressive discs for Broadcast – I think especially of his Chopin, Rachmaninov and the Grieg Concerto with the same Metropolitan band (and Stanley Chapple) that accompanies Reginald Paul. He also made some less well-known sides for Aco – and they are no less impressive. Cole is an undeservedly neglected figure though some will remember his Bach LPs from the 1960s. He was married to the fiddler Winifred Small, with whom he also recorded, and we should have examples of his musicianship on CD. End of sermon."

Bach
"These are thoughtful, considered performances; you feel Mr. Cole has a reason for everything he does." Review of Cole's recording of Bach's The Well-Tempered Clavier, book II in Gramophone Magazine, June 1963.

"…unfailing musicality, control of partplaying, complete accuracy, admirably firm rhythm, and an avoidance of all posturing and pretentiousness (would that the same could be said for all other Bach players!)" Review of Cole's recording of Bach's ''Well-Tempered Clavier book I in Gramophone Magazine, November 1962.

References

External links
 London Metropolitan Archives
 Maurice Cole plays Liszt's "Liebestraum" in a 1930 Pathé short film
Bournemouth Chamber Music Society

1902 births
1990 deaths
British classical pianists
English classical pianists
Male classical pianists
Musicians from London
20th-century classical pianists
20th-century English musicians
20th-century British male musicians